Madhya Pradesh Reorganisation Act, 2000 is an Act of the Parliament of India which enabled the creation of Chhattisgarh state out of Madhya Pradesh. The law was introduced by the NDA government headed by Prime Minister Vajpayee to fulfil its election promise.

Resulting changes

In addition, the Chhattisgarh High Court was set up.

See also
 Bihar Reorganisation Act, 2000, by which Jharkhand was created
 Uttar Pradesh Reorganisation Act, 2000, by which Uttarakhand was created

References

Acts of the Parliament of India 2000
Vajpayee administration initiatives
Reorganisation of Indian states
History of Madhya Pradesh (1947–present)
History of Chhattisgarh (1947–present)
2000s in Madhya Pradesh
2000s in Chhattisgarh